Wolfmother are an Australian hard rock band from Sydney, New South Wales. Formed in 2004, the group originally included vocalist and guitarist Andrew Stockdale, bassist and keyboardist Chris Ross, and drummer Myles Heskett. The band has since gone through many lineup changes, centred around Stockdale as the sole constant member, with the current incarnation also including drummer Hamish Rosser (2012 to 2013, 2017 to 2019, and again since 2021) and bassist and keyboardist Bobby Poulton (2019 to early 2021, and again since late 2021).

History

2004–2013
Andrew Stockdale, Chris Ross and Myles Heskett formed Wolfmother in 2004, after several years of jamming together. The group released their critically and commercially successful self-titled debut album in Australia in 2005, with an international release following the next year. Work soon began on a follow-up, however in August 2008 both Ross and Heskett left Wolfmother due to "irreconcilable personal and musical differences". Stockdale recorded "Back Round" with Resin Dogs drummer Dave Atkins later in the year, before unveiling the full new lineup early the next year, which also included Ian Peres on bass and keyboards, and Aidan Nemeth on rhythm guitar.

The second lineup's only album Cosmic Egg was released in 2009. After touring in promotion of the release, Atkins left Wolfmother in March 2010. The following month, he was replaced by Will Rockwell-Scott, formerly of the Mooney Suzuki. The group began working on the follow-up to Cosmic Egg in early 2011, however in February the next year it was announced that both Nemeth and Rockwell-Scott had recently quit the band. They were replaced by Vin Steele and former Vines drummer Hamish Rosser, respectively, while multi-instrumentalist Elliott Hammond was also added. Keep Moving was completed and released in 2013, credited as a Stockdale solo release.

Since 2013
Stockdale revived the Wolfmother moniker just a few months after retiring it, before Rosser left the band in June 2013. Hammond briefly took over on drums, before also leaving the next month. A third drummer in as many months, Tony McCall, lasted only a few weeks in the group. The band subsequently reverted to a trio with Steele switching over to drums, and in 2014 they released their third album New Crown. Steele had left by early 2015, with the Voidz and former Nine Inch Nails drummer Alex Carapetis taking his place for tour dates in April and May. For shows later in the year, Atkins took over on drums. For their fourth album Victorious, Stockdale and Peres were joined by session drummers Josh Freese and Joey Waronker. Carapetis returned for the subsequent Gypsy Caravan Tour.

By June 2017, Hamish Rosser had returned to the band. Long-term member Peres left Wolfmother in early 2018, committing to tour dates with Xavier Rudd instead. For their appearance at Mojo Burning Festival in April, the band played with Dave Atkins on rhythm guitar, Hobo Magic bassist Jake Bennett and an extra keyboardist. Starting in May, the band toured with bassist Brad Heald and keyboardist Lachy Doley, the latter of whom was replaced later in the year by Katie McGurl. From late 2019, the band's touring lineup comprised Stockdale, bassist and keyboardist Bobby Poulton, and drummer Brett "Wolfie" Wolfenden. In early 2021, Rosser returned again while bassist Alex McConnell joined the band. McConnell was replaced by a returning Poulton in November 2021, who has remained with the band since.

Members

Current

Former

Touring

Timeline

Lineups

References

External links
Wolfmother official website

Wolfmother